Jesse James is a Lucky Luke comic written by Goscinny and illustrated by Morris. The original French edition was printed in 1969 by Dargaud. English editions of this French series have been published by Dargaud, Cinebook. Brockhampton Press and Tara Press. It is based on the true story of Jesse James (1847–1882).

Plot
In 1880, the story begins with Jesse James, who idolizes and tries to emulate Robin Hood, but somehow he is not able to clearly define the line between the rich he is supposed to rob and the poor he is supposed to help. With the help of his Shakespeare aficionado brother Frank, he therefore simply redefines the term "poor" for his own benefit, and along with Cole Younger the two begin robbing trains en masse, forcing Lucky Luke to move out and stop them with the somewhat inept assistance of two Pinkerton detectives.

Characters 
 Jesse James (1847 - 1882), famous outlaw.
 Frank James (1843 - 1915), outlaw, leader of the James-Younger gang.
 Cole Younger (1844 - 1916), outlaw.

See also
 Jesse James

Notes
 Morris publications in Spirou BDoubliées

External links
 Lucky Luke official site album index 
 Goscinny website on Lucky Luke

Comics by Morris (cartoonist)
Comics set in the 19th century
Lucky Luke albums
1969 graphic novels
Works originally published in Spirou (magazine)
Works by René Goscinny
Works about Jesse James
Fiction set in 1880
Comics based on real people
Cultural depictions of Jesse James